"Tsst" is the seventh episode in the tenth season of the American animated television series South Park. The 146th episode of the series overall, it originally aired on Comedy Central in the United States on May 3, 2006. In the episode, Liane Cartman has problems controlling her son, and enlists several reality television shows to help with his problematic behavior.

Plot
After Cartman gets into trouble at school for forcing another student into a Saw-esque situation for mocking his weight, Liane admits that she cannot control her son anymore. She turns to Nanny 911 and Supernanny, but their attempts to change Cartman's behavior are unsuccessful, with Cartman psychologically harassing Nanny Stella about her decision to not have children and Jo Frost ending up in a mental hospital, sobbing and eating her own excrement while shouting "It's from Hell!".

Desperate, Liane turns to Cesar Millan, the Dog Whisperer. Instead of treating Cartman as a human child, Millan uses dog training techniques which prove highly effective, leaving Cartman intensely frustrated. Cartman's behavior improves after a while, although he feels he cannot control his actions. As Liane enjoys her more flexible lifestyle, Cartman plots to kill his mother, although the changes he underwent prevent him from executing his plan.

With Cartman's behavior in check, Millan returns for a final visit. Liane thanks and invites him on an outing, which he declines because he sees her as a client, not a friend. Dismayed at being turned down, Liane asks her son (who was previously her friend) to join her on the outing. After he refuses, she persuades Cartman to spend time with her, saying he can have anything he wishes; this makes Cartman return to normal as the episode ends with a shot of him having an unsettling smile on his face, while ominous music is heard playing.

Reception
IGNs Eric Goldman gave the episode a score of 8.0 out of 10, writing "While not among the terrific episodes that began the season, this was a very fun installment of the show, and a nice spotlight on Cartman and what it might take to finally make him obey." Jordan B. Peterson praised the episode, calling it a brilliant exposition of a Freudian Oedipal situation. When asked if he was offended by his caricature on the episode, Cesar Millan stated that he thought it and the entire episode was "fantastic".

Cultural references
There are numerous references to popular American reality television programs. Of the most prominent, shows such as Nanny 911 and Supernanny which are both British programs in origin are parodied extensively. Both TV show hosts Stella Reid and Jo Frost are portrayed having accentuated British accents and stereotypically bad teeth. While he reconnects his console with the TV, Cartman sings "Don't Stop Believin'" by Journey. Unlike the "real" television shows, neither Stella's or Jo's methods of disciplining unruly children work - ultimately forcing an insulted Stella to refuse to work with Cartman, and Jo Frost being admitted to a psychiatric hospital, eating her own excrement and repeating the phrase "It's from Hell!" The Dog Whisperer is also featured in the episode, along with show host Cesar Millan, who, unlike most celebrities that were portrayed on the show, is shown in a more positive light. A Skeksis from The Dark Crystal can be seen as one of the nannies. The visual effect of Cartman's angel and devil subconsciousnesses during the part where he almost attempts to kill his mother in her room was a similar reference to the 1997 science-fiction film Contact. The way Cartman changes as he makes his way down the hallway is a direct reference to the 1980 body horror film Altered States.

As the episode ends, the closing shot of Cartman staring towards the viewer is a reference to the closing shot of The Omen (1976).

Home media
"Tsst", along with the thirteen other episodes from South Parks tenth season, was released on a three-disc DVD set in the United States on August 21, 2007. The set includes brief audio commentaries by series co-creators Trey Parker and Matt Stone for each episode.

References

External links
 "Tsst" Full episode at South Park Studios
 

South Park (season 10) episodes